Ritman is a surname. Notable people with the surname include:

Jon Ritman, British game designer and programmer
Joost Ritman (born 1941), Dutch businessman
Louis Ritman (1889–1963), American painter

See also
Pitman (surname)